ESPN Africa is an African pay television sports channel owned by ESPN Inc., a joint venture between The Walt Disney Company (which owns a controlling 80% stake) and the Hearst Communications (which owns the remaining 20%), that was re-branded in August 2014, replacing Setanta Sports and Setanta Action. The channel broadcasts in Sub-Saharan Africa in English and French. It was also previously available for a brief period in 2016 in Portuguese.

Its programming mainly features football from Eredivisie, Scottish Premiership, Belgian Pro League, English Football League and Major League Soccer. The network was also a long-standing broadcaster of the South American competitions Copa Libertadores and Copa Sudamericana across Africa until the rights moved in 2017.

Also broadcasts: NBA, NFL, NHL, MLB, PFL, NRL rugby league and Basketball Africa League.

Previously, as the Irish-owned Setanta Africa, the channel broadcast GAA hurling and gaelic football, plus League of Ireland football.

In August 2019, it was announced that the network would rebrand as ESPN Africa on 30 August 2019, due to the acquisition of 21st Century Fox by Disney.

References

External links
 

ESPN media outlets
Sport in Africa
Sports television networks
Television channels and stations established in 2014
Television in Africa